Kuch Tappeh (also Romanized as Kūch Tappeh) is a village in Khararud Rural District, in the Central District of Khodabandeh County, Zanjan Province, Iran. At the 2006 census, its population was 1,044, in 228 families.

References 

Populated places in Khodabandeh County